Albert De Roocker (25 January 1904 – 8 March 1989) was a Belgian fencer. He won a silver medal in the team foil competition at the 1924 Summer Olympics.

References

External links
 

1904 births
1989 deaths
Belgian male fencers
Belgian foil fencers
Olympic fencers of Belgium
Fencers at the 1924 Summer Olympics
Fencers at the 1928 Summer Olympics
Olympic silver medalists for Belgium
Olympic medalists in fencing
Medalists at the 1924 Summer Olympics